Hook Norton is a village and civil parish in Oxfordshire, England. The 2011 Census recorded the parish's population as 2,117. The village is formed of four neighbourhoods: East End, Scotland End (in the west), Down End (in the centre) and Southrop (in the south).

Toponymy
In the Anglo-Saxon Chronicle in 917 the village is recorded as Hocneratun. The Domesday Book of 1086 records it as Hochenartone. A charter from 1130 records it as Hokenartona. An episcopal register entry from 1225 records it as Hokenartone. A record from 1267 records it as Hokenarton. The Taxatio Ecclesiastica of 1291 records it as Hoke Norton.  Other past spellings of the name include Hocceneretune (1050), Hogenarton (1216) and Okenardton (1263). Hegnorton is recorded in a plea roll from 1430.  The name is derived from Old English. Hocca may perhaps be the name of a person or tribe, although other interpretations are possible; ōra may refer to a hill slope and tūn is a settlement.  Today the village is colloquially known to its inhabitants as "Hooky" and sometimes as "The Hook".

History
The Anglo-Saxon Chronicle records that a Viking army from Northampton raided the Hook Norton area in 913. The village had a parish church by 922. The Domesday Book records that in 1086 Hook Norton had 76 villagers and two mills. Leland noted c.1540 the existence of a deer park at Hook Norton which was owned by the king, Henry VIII. The park had previously belonged to a Chaucer and Charles Brandon, 1st Duke of Suffolk. By the 1800s it was "an ancient park, long-disused and forgotten."

Hook Norton had a clockmaker, Thomas Webb, who maintained the turret clock at St. Giles' parish church, Wigginton from 1788 until 1834. Webb was succeeded in his trade at Hook Norton by John Paine, who maintained the clock at Wigginton from 1835 until 1855. In 1840 Paine built a new turret clock for St. George's parish church, Brailes, Warwickshire.

The former Banbury and Cheltenham Direct Railway, part of the Great Western Railway, served Hook Norton with a railway station at East End. British Railways closed the station in 1951 and closed the railway to all traffic in 1964. Tall stone pillars which supported two B&CDR viaducts can be seen in the valley to the south-east of the village. Near Hook Norton there were several ironstone quarries, evidence of which can still be seen. The Brymbo Ironworks closed in 1946 and was dismantled in 1948.

Hook Norton Brewery was founded in 1849 and is an important architectural example of a Victorian tower brewery, as well as containing a working Victorian steam engine. The brewery has a museum that includes a section on the history of the village. The village's 18th century hand-pumped fire engine, which was in use until 1896, is preserved in St. Peter's parish church.

Churches
The present Church of England parish church of Saint Peter is of Norman origin but also has Early English, Decorated Gothic and Perpendicular Gothic features. The Norman font is 11th century and is unusual in featuring pagan signs of the Zodiac. St. Peter's contains a number of wall paintings including saints, angels and the Apostles Saint Peter and Saint Paul.  The church tower has a ring of eight bells, all cast in 1949 by John Taylor & Co of Loughborough.   St Peter's is now the mother church of the Benefice of Hook Norton with Great Rollright, Swerford and Wigginton.  Hook Norton Baptist Church is among the oldest in Britain, having been founded 1640. Its present building is Georgian, built in 1781. Hook Norton also had a Methodist chapel, which was built in 1875.

Amenities

Hook Norton has a Church of England controlled primary school, shop, a post office and general store, a fire station crewed by retained firefighters, a GPs' practice, a dental practice, veterinary surgery, public library, a memorial village hall, a Women's Institute and a sports and social club.  Hook Norton Brewery is famous for brewing traditional real ale. Hook Norton hosts an annual music festival, Music at the Crossroads, that raises funds for many local charitable causes.  Hook Norton has three public houses, all of which are controlled by Hook Norton Brewery:
 The Gate Hangs High
 The Pear Tree Inn
 The Sun Inn

Sport and leisure

Hook Norton F.C. plays in the Witney and District Division 2. Hook Norton Cricket Club plays in Oxfordshire Cricket Association Division One. Hook Norton also has a tennis club, a running club and a Multi Use Games Area whose sports include netball.

References

Sources and further reading

External links

Hook Norton community website
Hook Norton Football Club
Hook Norton Sports & Social Club
Hook Norton Brewery
Hook Norton Festival of Fine Ales
Hook Norton Music at the Crossroads
Hook Norton: St.Peter's Church
Hook Norton Harriers running club
Hook Norton Pre-School Playgroup

Villages in Oxfordshire
Civil parishes in Oxfordshire